The 2014 Women's Futsal World Tournament was the fifth edition of the Women's Futsal World Tournament, the premier world championship for women's national futsal teams. The competition was to be hosted in Russia, but was moved to Hatillo District, in Costa Rica.

Venues

Referees
 José Francisco Katemo (Angola)
 Geovanny López Munguía (Costa Rica)
 Jeisson Peñaloza Cruz (Costa Rica)
 Ronny Castro Zumbado (Costa Rica)
 Diego Molina López (Costa Rica)
 Sergio Enrique Cabrera Acosta (Cuba)
 Roberto Michel Sánchez Álvarez (Cuba)
 Jorge Antonio Flores Hernández (El Salvador)
 Carlos Enrique González Sánchez (Guatemala)
 Deon Feassal (Guyana)
 Francisco Javier Rivera Llerenas  (Mexico)
 Wenceslaos Aguilar Díaz (Panama)
 Luis Alberto Aguilar Racero (Panama)
 Shane Butler (United States)
 Renata Leite Neves (Brazil)
 Raquel González Ruano (Spain)
 Miguel López González (Cuba)
 Leroy Rafael Brown Gómez (Guatemala)

Group stage

Group A

Group B

Final round

Final ranking

References

External links

Costa Rican FA website

Women World Tournament
Women's Futsal World Tournament
Futsal
International futsal competitions hosted by Costa Rica